Molly Caudery (born 17 March 2000) is an English athlete who competes in the pole vault event. In the 2022 Commonwealth Games Molly got silver in pole vault.  She has a personal best performance of 4.60 metres. She was born in Truro, Cornwall and lives in Redruth, Cornwall .

Athletics career
Caudery competed for England at the 2018 Commonwealth Games on the Gold Coast, Queensland, Australia finishing fifth. She was England's youngest athlete at the games.

She won a silver medal aged seventeen at the 2017 European Athletics U20 Championships in Grosseto, Italy and in 2018 gained the British junior pole vault record of 4.53 metres. Still aged seventeen Caudery won a British senior indoor title in February 2018.

At the 2022 Commonwealth Games in Birmingham, Caudery won the silver medal.

References

2000 births
Living people
English female pole vaulters
Athletes (track and field) at the 2018 Commonwealth Games
Commonwealth Games competitors for England
Commonwealth Games silver medallists for England
Commonwealth Games medallists in athletics
Athletes (track and field) at the 2022 Commonwealth Games
Medallists at the 2022 Commonwealth Games